Ginmill Perfume was a US/Canada-only compilation album by The Flaming Stars, featuring tracks drawn from the first four Vinyl Japan albums and singles prior to 2001.

Track listing 
"Like Trash" - 3:29
"Ten Feet Tall" - 4:23
"Who's Out There?" - 3:45
"Some Things You Don't Forget" - 3:12
"Only Tonight" - 2:25
"Bury My Heart at Pier 13" - 3:37
"The Last Picture Show" - 3:52
"New Hope for the Dead" - 2:39
"You Don't Always Want What You Get" - 4:01
"Blood Money" - 3:09
"The Face on the Bar Room Floor" - 3:19
"A Place in the Sun" - 4:11
"Bring Me The Rest of Alfredo Garcia" - 3:17
"Coffin Ed and Grave Digger Jones" - 3:01
"Kiss Tomorrow Goodbye" - 4:03

References

The Flaming Stars albums
2001 compilation albums
Alternative Tentacles compilation albums